Paduka Pahala (died 1417) was East King of Sulu, most famous for being the first king from the area of the modern day Philippines to be buried in China. He ruled one of the three Kingdoms on Sulu during his time.

Journey to China and Death
During 1417, the East King of Sulu, Paduka Pahala, sailed with his family and 300 other people of noble descent. He was to pay tribute to the Yongle Chinese emperor, Zhu Di, who was of the Ming Dynasty. While he was welcomed by the emperor upon his arrival in China, he nevertheless contracted a mysterious disease on his way home and died at Dezhou, a town in Shandong province in China. The emperor immediately commissioned artisans and sculptors to build a tomb for the deceased monarch, which still stands today.

Descendants
Tradition dictates that the descendants of Paduka Pahala remained in China and were subsequently classified as members of the Hui nationality since they converted to Islam while in Shandong and were attended to by Hui people living there. The surnames of the descendants of the two sons Paduka left in Shandong are An and Wen.

Popular culture
He was immortalised in the Filipino film Hari sa Hari, Lahi sa Lahi, which recounts his voyage to China to give tribute to the Chinese Emperor.

References

1417 deaths
15th-century monarchs in Asia
Year of birth unknown
People from Sulu
15th-century Filipino people